Gert-Jan Oplaat (born 22 November 1964, Markelo, Overijssel) is a Dutch former politician.

Career

After secondary education he became a member of an agricultural family business. In 1994 he protested against the national manure and ammonia policies.

In 1989 he joined the VVD. Between 1994 and 1998 he was a municipal councillor in Markelo.

He was elected in the 1998 general election. He was his party's spokesman for agriculture. In 2004 he presented a pamphlet arguing for a more right-conservative course, together with Geert Wilders. His place on the electoral list was too low to be elected in the 2006 general election.

After leaving parliament he became a consultant, administrator in branche organisations and chairman of the regional chamber of commerce.

Until 2014 he was chairman of the VVD provincial branch in Overijssel.

In 2022 he left the VVD because of discontent about its policies during the nitrogen crisis (:nl:Stikstofcrisis). After being contacted by multiple parties, he joined the agrarian BBB.

Personal life
Oplaat is married. He performs as a cabaretier and singer. He is a Knight in the Order of Orange-Nassau and a member of the Protestant Church in the Netherlands.

References

1964 births
Living people
People from Hof van Twente
People's Party for Freedom and Democracy politicians
Members of the House of Representatives (Netherlands)
Dutch civil servants
Farmer–Citizen Movement politicians